The Australian cricket team toured India, played three One Day Internationals and two Test matches between 1 and 24 October 2010.

Squads

Tour Match

Test series

1st Test

Australia batted first and with the century from Shane Watson makes a score of 428 runs. Zaheer Khan took five wickets . In reply India put 405 runs on the board giving the Aussies a lead of 23 
runs. Australian second innings was reduced to 192 runs by good performance by all Indian bowlers. The target for India was 216 and it was not an easy task for Indian batsmen as Aussie bowlers troubled Indian batsmen with their pace attack and took quick wickets.

It was a perfectly scripted game for the Aussies. India had ended day 4 at 55 for 4 and they still needed 161 runs for a victory. The Australian pacers started afresh on the final day and India lost another four wickets for 48 runs. First Ishant Sharma shared a partnership of 81 runs with Laxman for the ninth wicket before Pragyan Ojha and Laxman completed one of the greatest comebacks in cricket. The duo added the required 11 runs and helped India win the match by one wicket.

2nd Test

ODI series

1st ODI

2nd ODI

|India own the toss and they invite Australia to bat first.
Australia lost both the openers at an early stage but the century run partnership between Michael Hussey and Michael Clarke puts the things under control for Aussies. They steadied Australia with a 144-run stand and Michael Hussey(69r,77 b) was dismissed after scoring a half century. Then comes the Cameron White joins Michael Clarke(111 r, 139 b,7×4's,1×6) in the middle keeps increasing the score card with boundaries as he scores 89 runs off just 49 balls with six fours and six sixes. Clarke scores his fifth century of his career.
White left India facing a tough target. Last five overs cost India 84 runs.
|India was set a target of 290 runs.
|India lost both their openers in quick time and were dismissed by Clint McKay. Then Virat Kohli (118r,121b,11×4's,1×6's) and Yuvraj Singh(58r,87b) stabilizes the India's innings with their 137 run stand. Later Yuvraj Singh was dismissed and brings Suresh Raina to join with Kohli and they both add some quick runs. Virat Kohli scores to his third century and change gears scoring some quick runs in the middle and was dismissed. Suresh Raina then finished the remaining things with debutant Saurabh Tiwary and takes India to victory of five wickets.

3rd ODI

Media coverage

Television
India: NEO Cricket
India: Doordarshan (only ODI matches)
Australia: Fox Sports
United Kingdom and Ireland: Sky Sports
South Africa, Kenya and Zimbabwe: SuperSport
Canada: ATN CBN
United Arab Emirates: Arab Digital Distribution

References

2010
International cricket competitions in 2010–11
2010 in Indian cricket
Indian cricket seasons from 2000–01
2010 in Australian cricket